Bastøy is an unpopulated island in Horten municipality, Norway. Bastøy Prison, a minimum-security prison is located on the island.

Islands of Vestfold og Telemark